Hyalinarcha is a genus of moths of the family Crambidae.

Species
Hyalinarcha hyalina (Hampson, 1913)
Hyalinarcha hyalinalis (Hampson, 1896)

References

Eurrhypini
Crambidae genera
Taxa named by Eugene G. Munroe